The mirror shiner (Notropis spectrunculus). is a species small freshwater cyprinid fish of the  upper Tennessee River drainage in Virginia, North Carolina, Tennessee, South Carolina and Georgia, in the USA.

References 

 

Notropis
Fish described in 1868